United States Army vehicles must be marked with a unit designation to foster accountability and promote attention to detail during maintenance operations. The term "bumper number" refers the combination of numbers and letters on the front and rear of a vehicle that uniquely identify that vehicle.

There are many regulations that govern the use of bumper numbers. These regulations serve to standardize markings across the Army in order to improve efficiency and ensure markings add to combat readiness.

The appearance of bumper numbers is a quick and representative sampling of the maintenance status of a unit.  Proficiency in marking vehicles is an excellent indicator of deeper and more substantial efficacy of a unit. Bumper numbers also serve to provide a quick reference for identification and minimize confusion in the fog of war.

Applicable Army regulations 

Army Technical Bulletin 43-0209, Color, Marking, and Camouflage Painting of Military Vehicles, Construction Equipment and Materials Handling Equipment, standardizes how vehicle bumper numbers are applied. The markings are divided into four positions. Positions 1 and 2 are applied on the left, while positions 3 and 4 are applied on the right. The positions identify
The major command, organization or activity the equipment is associated with;
The intermediate organization or activity;
The unit that operates and maintains the vehicle; and
The specific vehicle number (often associated with the order of march).
Anything beyond this policy such as assigning a specific number against a specific unit position is a matter of unit standard operating procedure. However, the number six has traditionally been associated with the commander of the element. For example, a Humvee assigned to the commander of Charlie Company would be designated "C06," while the 1st Platoon, Charlie Company's command vehicle would be "C16," 2nd Platoon would be "C26," etc.

Army Technical Bulletin 43-0139, Painting and Instructions for Army Materiel, gives information about applying ID markings over camouflage colors. Black lettering must be used over brown or green paint, green lettering over black paint, and brown lettering over white or tan paint. There are only two authorized methods of making bumper numbers: using adhesive vinyl (stickers) and paint.

Army Regulation 750-1, Army Materiel Maintenance Policy, allows MACOM commanders to conceal bumper numbers in tactical conditions. Overseas commanders may comply with international agreements regarding vehicle bumper numbers. Some overseas commands paint solid light color rectangular boxes as the background for bumper numbers.

See also
 Comparative Military Ranks
 JROTC
 Timeline of United States military operations
 ROTC
 Transformation of the United States Army
 United States Army Center of Military History
 U.S. Army Soldier's Creed

References

External links

Army.mil – United States Army official website
GoArmy.com – official recruiting site
America's Army – official Army Game Project site
Finding Aids for researching the US Army (compiled by the United States Army Center of Military History)
Military Vehicle Camouflage
The U.S. Army's Technical Bulletin 43-0209
Joint Service Pollution Prevention Opportunity Handbook – Improved Stenciling and Marking System
FM 1, The Army (14 June 2005)

United States Army vehicles
Military vehicles of the United States